The Texas Band of Yaqui Indians is a cultural heritage organization for individuals who identify as descendants of Yaqui people, and are dedicated to cultural and ethnic awareness of the Yaqui. The organization is headquartered in Lubbock, Texas. The Texas Band of Yaqui Indians is an unrecognized organization. They are neither a federally recognized tribe nor a state-recognized tribe.

Organization 
In 2019, the Texas Band of Yaqui Indians organized as a 501(c)(3) nonprofit organization, based in Lubbock, Texas. It is an art, culture, and humanities nonprofit and charity. As of 2020, Israel Ramirez was the organization's president and chairman. Sam Ramirez is the vice chairman.

Honorary resolution 

In 2015, the Texas state senate passed a Senate Resolution 989, a "congratulatory & honorary" resolution authored by State Senator Charles Perry.

Congratulatory resolutions such as SR No. 989 are not the same as state-recognition. Texas has "no legal mechanism to recognize tribes." This organization has neither filed a petition for federal recognition as a Native American tribe, nor sent a letter of intent to file a petition for federal recognition.

Notes

References

External links
 Texas Band of Yaqui Indians
 State Resolution SR#989

American people of Yaqui descent
Cultural organizations based in Texas
Non-profit organizations based in Lubbock, Texas
2019 establishments in Texas
Unrecognized tribes in the United States